Elections for the House of Representatives of the Philippines were held on May 14, 2001. This was the next election succeeding the events of the 2001 EDSA Revolution that deposed Joseph Estrada from the presidency; his vice president, Gloria Macapagal Arroyo became president, and her party, Lakas NUCD-UMDP, and by extension the People Power Coalition (PPC), dominated the midterm elections winning majority of the seats in the Senate and in the House of Representatives.

The elected representatives served in the 12th Congress from 2001 to 2004.

Results

District elections

Party-list election

On Election Day, parties are guaranteed to win at least one seat if they surpass 2% of the national vote, then another seat for every 2% until it reaches the maximum of three seats per party. However, with the Supreme Court decision on VFP vs. COMELEC, the 2% increments was declared unconstitutional. Instead, the party with the most votes gets at least one seat, then another seat for every 2% until it reaches the maximum of three seats. For parties that got 2% of the vote but did not have the most votes, they will automatically have one more seat, then any extra seats will be determined via dividing their votes to the number of votes of the party with the most votes, then the quotient will be multiplied by the number of seats the party with the most votes has. The product, disregarding decimals (it is not rounded), will be the number of seats a party will get.

For example, for the Association of Philippine Electric Cooperatives (APEC):

Disregarding decimals, APEC won one additional seat aside from one seat they automatically won after surpassing the 2% threshold.

See also
12th Congress of the Philippines

References

  

2001
Lower house elections in the Philippines
May 2001 events in the Philippines